The  is a pilgrimage route on the Kii Peninsula in the Kansai region of Japan. It begins in Yanagi-no-shuku, a former ferry station on the Yoshino River in Nara prefecture, leads through the 1200-1900 meter  Ōmine mountain region of Yoshino and Kumano in Wakayama Prefecture and ends after about 170 kilometers at the Kumano Hongū Taisha.

Overview
According to tradition, the Ōmine Okugakemichi was established as a training ground for Shugendō, a syncretic religion incorporating aspects of Taoism, Shinto, esoteric Buddhism and traditional Japanese shamanism. by the Asuka period mystic En no Gyōja. It connects Kimpusen-ji in Yoshino district, Nara Prefecture with the Kumano Sanzan in southern Wakayama Prefecture. The route is very rugged and isolated, with a number of demanding sections up to narrow paths on steep slopes and steep climbs on cliffs. Mount Ōmine in the route's name is a specific holy mountain, but originally, the term referred to all of the Yoshino Mountains along the route. Believers took either Kumano or Yoshino as a starting point, depending on their religious orientation. The latter direction has dominated since the Edo period. 

Along the route are 75 spiritual places called nabiki (靡) in caves, on rocks, at waterfalls, on mountain peaks, etc. are used for prayer or for spiritual exercises. For religious reasons, women have been forbidden to travel most of the route, and Mount Ōmine remains closed to women to this date. The path takes several days to complete, and is mostly wilderness with no settlements, and few possibilities to turn off the path once started. 

During the Edo Period, Kishū Domain controlled most of the territory the path traversed, and often viewed Shugendō monks with suspicion. After the Meiji Restoration, Shugendō faced hostility from the Meiji government's separation of Buddhism and Shinto policies, and large portions of the path were lost or reverted to wilderness. In 1936, the area became part of the Yoshino-Kumano National Park, and from the 1980s, amateur historians and hiking groups have worked to restore the trail and to build mountain shelters for hikers and modern Shugendō followers attempting the trail. In 2002, the trail was designated as a National Historic Site, and it was included within the Sacred Sites and Pilgrimage Routes in the Kii Mountain Range UNESCO World Heritage Site since 2004.

Gallery

The 75 Nabiki

Yanagi-no-shuku
Jōrokusan
Yoshinosan
Mikumari Jinja
Kinpujinja
Aizen-no-shuku
Nizō-no-shuku
Jōshinmon
Sanjōgatake
Ozasa-no-shuku
Amidagamori
Waki-no-shuku
Fugendake
Shō-no-iwaya
Mirokudake
Chigodomari
Shichiyōdake
Gyōjagaeri
Ichi-no-tawa
Ishiyasumi-no-shuku
Kōbase-no-shuku
Misen
Chōsengatake
Furuimajuku
Hakkyōgatake
Myōjōgatake()
Kiku-no-iwaya
Zenji-no-mori
Goko-no-mine
Fune-no-tawa
Shichimensan
Yōji-no-shuku
Busshōgatake
Kujakudake</
Kūhachidake
Shakagatake
Totsumon
Jinsen-no-shuku
Shōten-no-mori
Gokakusen
Dainichidake
Senjudake
Futatsuiwa
Sobakusadake
Koike-no-shuku
Chigusadake
Zenkisan
Zenkisanjūtaki
Okumoridake
Komoridake
Hannyadake
Nehandake
Kenkōmon
Jikyō-no-shuku
Heiji-no-shuku
Nuta-no-juku
Gyōsendake
Kasasuteyama
Yarigatake
Shia-no-shuku
Kikugaike
Ogamikaeshi
Kōshōzan
Furuya-no-shuku
Nyoijugadake
Tamakisan
Mizunomi-no-shuku
Kishi-no-shuku
Godaisondake
Kongōtawa
Daigokudake
Fukikoshiyama
Shingū (Kumano Hayatama Taisha)
Nachisan (Kumano Nachi Taisha)
Hongūtaisha

See also
List of Historic Sites of Japan (Nara)
List of Historic Sites of Japan (Wakayama)

Literature
 Morisawa Yoshinobu: Ōmine Okugakemichi 75 nabiki. Nakanishiya Shuppan, 2006 ISBN 4-779-50084-2
 Shugendō shugyōtaikei hensaniinkai: Shugendō shugyōtaikei. Kokusho kankōkai, 1994 ISBN 4-336-03411-7
 Swanson, Paul L.: Shugendō and the Yoshino-Kumano Pilgrimage - An Example of Mountain Pilgrimage. In: Monumenta Nipponica, Vol. 36, No. 1 (1981), S. 55–84.

External Links

Wakayama Prefecture World Heritage Center
 ICOMOS (2004). Advisory Body Evaluation. Retrieved on 2009-07-27. 
 Agency for Cultural Affairs (2003). Sacred Sites and Pilgrimage Routes in the Kii Mountain Range, and the Cultural Landscapes that Surround Them. Retrieved on 2014-05-04.
 Sacred Sites and Pilgrimage Routes in The Kii Mountain Range - UNESCO website (2004)  Retrieved on 2018-11-4.

References

Hiking trails in Japan
Historic Sites of Japan
Japanese pilgrimages
Shugendō
World Heritage Sites in Japan
Tourist attractions in Nara Prefecture
Tourist attractions in Wakayama Prefecture
Tanabe, Wakayama
Shingū, Wakayama